Cheung Chi Yung (born 30 June 1989 in Hong Kong) is a former Hong Kong professional football player who played as a centre back.

Club career

Tai Po
Cheung joined Tai Po youth team and was promoted to the first team in the 2008–09 season and was paid HK$3,000 per month. However, he was only given limited match chances and thus he chose to leave the club after the 2011–12 season.

Sun Hei
Cheung joined fellow First Division club Sunray Cave JC Sun Hei. He played his debut AFC Cup match in the season.

Yuen Long
After spending a season at Sun Hei, Cheung joined newly promoted First Division club Yuen Long on a free transfer on 3 June 2013.

South China
On 10 June 2015, Cheung joined  South China on a one-year contract.

Pegasus
Cheung moved onto Pegasus at the beginning of the 2016–17 season. He became a regular starter, appearing in 16 league matches for the club in the first season.

In July 2020, Cheung left the club after his contract expired. Since then he has obtained licenses as bartender and personal fitness coach. 

On 3 November 2020, Cheung announced his retirement from professional football.

Yuen Long 
In March 2021, Cheung joined Yuen Long.

International career
On 3 January 2016, Cheung scored his first goal for Hong Kong in the 38th Guangdong–Hong Kong Cup.

Career statistics

Club
 As of 21 May 2021.

1 Others include Hong Kong Season Play-offs.

Honours

Club
Tai Po
Hong Kong FA Cup: 2008–09

International
Hong Kong
Guangdong–Hong Kong Cup: 2018

References

External links
 

1989 births
Living people
Association football defenders
Hong Kong First Division League players
Hong Kong Premier League players
Tai Po FC players
Sun Hei SC players
Yuen Long FC players
South China AA players
TSW Pegasus FC players
Hong Kong footballers
Hong Kong League XI representative players